Oliver Loftéen (12 April 1979 – 30 August 2021) was a Swedish actor. Loftéen starred in several classic Swedish drama and comedy movies.

Personal life
In 2016, Loftéen, a member of the neo-Nazi group known as the Nordic Resistance Movement, admitted to assaulting his parents, citing his father's communist views as a motive. 

Loftéen was diagnosed with Asperger syndrome shortly before his death.

Selected filmography
Underjordens hemlighet (The Underground Secret)
Bert - Den sista oskulden (Bert - The Last Virgin)
Tic Tac
Vägen ut (The Way Out)
Pusselbitar (Pieces Of A Puzzle)
Sex, hopp och kärlek (Sex, Hope And Love)

References

External links

1979 births
2021 deaths
Swedish male actors
Male actors from Stockholm
People with Asperger syndrome
Actors with autism
Swedish neo-Nazis